Shahid Israr (March 1, 1950 - April 29, 2013)  was a  Pakistani cricketer from Karachi, Sindh,Son of Israr ul Haque who played in one Test against New Zealand as wicket-keeper in 1976.

He played 31 first-class matches, scoring 868 runs at an average of 28. He took 66 catches and made 22 stumpings. His first-class career spanned 11 years, from 1968 to 1979.

External links 
 

1950 births
2013 deaths
Pakistan Test cricketers
Pakistani cricketers
Karachi Whites cricketers
Karachi Greens cricketers
Karachi Blues cricketers
Sindh cricketers
Sind A cricketers
Karachi A cricketers
Punjab (Pakistan) cricketers